Nabb is an unincorporated community in Clark and Scott counties, in the U.S. state of Indiana.

History
Nabb was named for General Nabb, a railroad official.

The community has had two post offices. The first one ran from 1878 to 1881, and the second one ran from 1914 to 1970.

Nabb was hit by an EF4 tornado on March 2, 2012. The tornado came from Marysville, five miles to the east, and proceeded toward Chelsea.

Geography

See also
Tornado outbreak of March 2–3, 2012

References

Unincorporated communities in Clark County, Indiana
Unincorporated communities in Scott County, Indiana
Unincorporated communities in Indiana
Louisville metropolitan area